Mohammad Gulrez is an International Relations & Global Governance expert. Presently he serves as Pro Vice Chancellor, Aligarh Muslim University. He has also served as Dean, Faculty of International Studies, Director, Centre for South African & Brazilian Studies & Coordinator for Conflict Resolution & Peace Studies Programme at Aligarh Muslim University. 
Prof Gulrez was on a Deputation from Indian Council for Cultural Relations, Ministry of External Affairs, Govt of India for a period of 6 months to the India Chair at University of Colombo, Sri Lanka from July 2017 to December 2017. 
From January 1999 to January 2004, he worked as visiting Faculty, Department of Political and Administrative Sciences at the National University of Rwanda, Central Africa. 
Prof Gulrez was the Consultant/Researcher, Good Governance (Component) for the Poverty Reduction Strategy Paper (PRSP) Project, Govt. of Rwanda (2002).
Prof Gulrez is also on the International Advisory Board, Asian Review Institute of Asian Studies, Chulalongkorn University, Bangkok, Thailand. 
He is also the Member of Academic Forum, Asia Pacific Observatory, Montevideo, Uruguay.
He has also been associated with the Foreign Policy Analysis Program, Mershon Centre, Ohio State University,
Columbus, Ohio and Muslim Politics Project, Council On Foreign Relations Programme, New York, United States of America.

Prof Gulrez is currently working on Confidence Building Measures focusing on both the bi-lateral and multi-lateral tracks of the peace process.
Prof Gulrez has participated in seminars and workshops in USA, Iran, Pakistan, Libya, South Africa, Thailand, United Kingdom, Ghana, Senegal, Saudi Arabia, Sri Lanka & Kyrgyzstan.

Specialization

His area of specialization is Conflict Resolution , Ethnic Conflicts, Civil Society, and Poverty Alleviation.

Published works
Prof Gulrez author of these books and also present 100 (approx) Research paper/project National and International Seminars in India.

Books
 Conflict Transformation in West Asia - Oslo Process and Beyond: The Transcend Perspective (2004)
 Settlements and Resistance in the Occupied Territories (2005)
 Constitutional Poll Battle : A Study of Iranian Presidential Election 2005 (2008)
 Area Studies in India : Challenges Ahead (2009)
 Arab Spring & Prospects of Peace in West Asia (2015)
 Rising India, China, Brazil & South Africa : Prospects and Challenges (2016)
Prospects of Cooperation in Higher Education & Capacity Building : A Case Study of India and Sri Lanka (2017)

References
 http://indiawires.com/19870/business/brics-nations-emerging-as-worlds-most-influential-economies/
 http://www.saudigazette.com.sa/index.cfm?method=home.PrintContent&fa=regcon&action=Print&contentid=20150325238119
 http://timesofindia.indiatimes.com/city/varanasi/BHU-holds-seminar-on-peacebuilding/articleshow/19334932.cms
 https://books.google.com/books?id=YopTyDFI1U4C&pg=PA16&lpg=PA16&dq=Professor+Mohammad+Gulrez+Department+of+West+Asian+Studies+Aligarh&source=bl&ots=OF-jKyVDkz&sig=bCAlbBJZLHM1abtg8yfWCQhdUss&hl=en&sa=X&ved=0CEYQ6AEwB2oVChMIiezGofSKyAIVxCGmCh26HgHZ#v=onepage&q=Professor%20Mohammad%20Gulrez%20Department%20of%20West%20Asian%20Studies%20Aligarh&f=false
 http://www.muslimissues.com/amu-appoints-new-management-authorities-for-schools/
 http://academicfoundation.org/index.php?route=product/print_brocture&product_id=450
 http://svuniversity.ac.in/Dept/Journal/committee.html
 http://www.icwa.in/pdfs/icrfourthiaac.pdf
 http://www.slideshare.net/drhamidraihan/a-m-u-gazette-janfeb
 http://www.rina.in/national/a-two-day-interdisciplinary-national-seminar-on-%E2%80%9Cthe-arab-spring-and-peace-in-west-asia%E2%80%9D-at-amu/
 http://amuoldboys.blogspot.in/2013/10/prof-mohammad-gulrez-director-centre.html
 http://syedasadhusain.blogspot.in/2010/09/residential-coaching-academy-interviews.html
 http://shahernama.com/shiekh-rashid-al-ghannushi-visits-aligarh-muslim-university/
 https://web.archive.org/web/20160304093628/http://bhupr.nt-soft.com/admin/detailview.aspx?nt=2
 http://www.issaindia.in/oip/Complete%20Brochure.pdf 
 http://twocircles.net/2014feb01/national_seminar_strategic_options_amu.html#.VgIftZd3vK8
 http://www.amunetwork.com/2015/09/amu-faculty-members-publish-books-vc.html
 http://jmi.ac.in/upload/employeeresume/arahman.pdf
 http://www.bhu.ac.in/RAR/Evaluative%20Reports%20of%20Departments%20%20(Faculty%20wise)/Faculty%20of%20Social%20Sciences/Malviya%20Centre%20for%20Peace%20Research.pdf
 http://www.ourladyfatima.org/independence-day-celebrations-2015/
 http://www.vlmsjournals.in/uploads/3/1/7/9/31798897/uttar_pradesh_journal_of_social_science_research.pdf
 https://web.archive.org/web/20131010013021/http://mcpr-bhu.org/activities.html
 http://www.vlmsjournals.in/uploads/3/1/7/9/31798897/uttar_pradesh_journal_of_social_science_research.pdf
 http://www.publishingindia.com/News/Editors-Interview.aspx
 http://www.academicfoundation.com/n_detail/westasia.asp
 http://www.africanstudies.in/asa-page.php?pageid=209
 http://andlaaligarh.blogspot.in/2011/07/amu-residential-coaching-academy.html
 http://twocircles9.rssing.com/chan-7296818/all_p180.html
 http://www.brunchnews.com/northern-voices-online/general-news/directorate-of-school-education-gets-new-office-bearers-3082588
 http://radianceweekly.in/portal/issue/moral-cowards-vs-moral-lepers/
 http://myamu.in/gallery/prof-mohammad-gulrez
 http://twocircles.net/2013dec17/homage_paid_mandela_amu.html#.VgIkSpd3vK8
 http://www.bhu.ac.in/social_sciences/mcpr/activities.php
 http://www.publishingindia.com/Research/ProductInfo/Editorial-Team.aspx?InfoID=5
 http://www.rina.in/national/rich-homage-paid-to-mandela/
 http://jamiajournal.com/2012/08/13/brazilian-ambassador-duarte-speaks-at-jamia/
 http://www.kkagencies.com/index.php?p=sr&Field=prefix,title,subtitle,annt,voldet,series&String=Norway,%20Oslo%20Process,%20Oslo%20Institute,%20Mission%20to%20Oslo,%20Trondheim,%20Stavanger,%20Drammen,%20Norwegian,%20Swedish,%20Danish,%20Scandinavian,%20Faroese,%20Icelandic&Exactly=no&Match=word&zS=title,subtitle,bookcode&arrStr=yes&delStr=,&Ds=Norway
 http://opac.lib.seu.ac.lk/cgi-bin/koha/opac-detail.pl?biblionumber=40870
 http://dspace.africaportal.org/jspui/bitstream/123456789/34175/1/RWANDA%20CHAPTER.pdf?1

Living people
Academic staff of Aligarh Muslim University
1961 births